Bharatiya Janata Party, Punjab (or BJP Punjab) (BJP;), 
is the state unit of the Bharatiya Janata Party in Punjab. Its head office is situated at the Amar Sahid Dr. Syama Prasad, Mukherjee Smarak Bhawan, Dakshin Marg, Sector-37-A, Chandigarh, Punjab-160036, India. The current president of BJP Punjab is Ashwani Kumar Sharma.

History

Electoral Performance

Lok Sabha Elections

Legislative Assembly elections

Leadership

Elected members

Incumbent member(s) of Parliament

Incumbent member(s) of Legislative Assembly

President

See also

Bharatiya Janata Party
National Democratic Alliance
Rashtriya Sikh Sangat
Shiromani Akali Dal

References

Works cited
 
Bharatiya Janata Party
Punjab